The Collusive Actions Act 1488 (4 Hen 7 c 20) was an Act of the Parliament of England.

The words from "and over that be it enacted and ordeyned" to "woll sue in that behalf" were repealed by section 1 of, and Schedule 1 to, the Statute Law Revision Act 1948.

This Act was repealed by section 1 of, and Schedule 1 to, the Statute Law Revision Act 1958.

Eire
This Act was retained for the Republic of Ireland by section 2(2)(a) of, and Part 2 of Schedule 1 to, the Statute Law Revision Act 2007.

References
Halsbury's Statutes,

External links
List of legislative effects in the Republic of Ireland from the Irish Statute Book.

Acts of the Parliament of England (1485–1603)
1480s in law
1488 in England